Wilhelm Kubica (born 29 December 1943) is a Polish gymnast. He competed at the 1964 Summer Olympics, the 1968 Summer Olympics and the 1972 Summer Olympics.

References

1943 births
Living people
Polish male artistic gymnasts
Olympic gymnasts of Poland
Gymnasts at the 1964 Summer Olympics
Gymnasts at the 1968 Summer Olympics
Gymnasts at the 1972 Summer Olympics
European champions in gymnastics
People from Rybnik
Sportspeople from Silesian Voivodeship